Daniele Giorgini and Adrian Ungur won he title, beating Aslan Karatsev and Valery Rudnev 4–6, 7–6(7–4), [10–1]

Seeds

Draw

Draw

References
 Main Draw

BRD Brasov Challenger - Doubles
2014 Doubles